The 6B4T movement is an online radical feminist movement that spread from South Korea to China whose members organize in opposition to sexism and patriarchal structures. It is the first movement that started with the fourth wave of feminism in Korea. A notable aspect of the 6B4T movement is its members' commitment to never marry men or have heterosexual sexual relations, nor bear children. 

Beginning in 2019, the movement grew out of the South Korean 4B movement, whose members also renounce sex, child-rearing, dating, and marriage with men. In Korean-language abbreviation, "6B" refers to the same four commandments of the 4B movement as well as not buying sexist products and supporting fellow single women practicing the movement, while "4T" refers to rejecting strict beauty standards, hypersexual depictions of women in Japanese otaku culture, religion, and idol culture.

After crossing over from South Korea, discussion of 6B4T blossomed on the Chinese social network Douban, which centers around posting media reviews but draws a particularly young, educated membership. It is among this population of young, well-educated women that the movement has gained popularity, according to the scholar Leta Hong Fincher.

While a fringe element of China's wider feminist movement, in 2021 6B4T drew significant attention from Chinese government censors, which is credited with inadvertently boosting the movement's profile both in China and internationally. In April of that year, several Douban groups affiliated with the movement were shut down for content relating to "extremism, radical politics, and ideologies," and the phrase "6B4T" was banned on the platform as well.

See also 

 Feminism in South Korea
 Feminism in China

References 

2021 in Internet culture
21st-century social movements
Feminist movements and ideologies
Internet-based activism
Feminism in China
Radical feminism
Separatist feminism